Viktor Korniyenko (born 14 February 1999) is a professional Ukrainian football defender who plays for Shakhtar Donetsk in the Ukrainian Premier League.

Career
Born in the Poltava Oblast, Korniyenko began to play with Vorskla Poltava youth sportive school system and after continued in the different Ukrainian youth sportive schools.

He made his début for FC Mariupol in the Ukrainian Premier League as a start squad player in a drawing match against FC Karpaty Lviv on 11 August 2019 and was substituted in a second-half.

International career
Korniyenko was a part of the Ukraine national under-20 football team that won the 2019 FIFA U-20 World Cup. He played one of the key roles in Ukraine's success, appearing in all 7 of his team's matches (6 of them without substitutions).

He made his Ukraine national football team debut on 8 September 2021 in a friendly against the Czech Republic, a 1–1 away draw. He scored Ukraine's goal.

International goal
Scores and results list Ukraine's goal tally first.

Personal life
As for 2019 he is married with a wife Arina. The couple has a daughter Sofiya.

Career statistics

Club

Honours

International
Ukraine U20
 FIFA U-20 World Cup: 2019

Orders
 Order of Merit, 3rd Class

References

External links
 
 

1999 births
Living people
Sportspeople from Poltava
Ukrainian footballers
FC Mariupol players
FC Shakhtar Donetsk players
Ukrainian Premier League players
Association football defenders
Ukraine international footballers
Ukraine youth international footballers
Ukraine under-21 international footballers